Saint-Martin-des-Champs is a commune in the Cher department in central France.

Geography
The village lies on the right bank of the Vauvise, which forms most of the commune's western border.

Population

See also
Communes of the Cher department

References

Communes of Cher (department)
Bituriges Cubi